The Amba Barwa  Wildlife Sanctuary is situated in satpuda hills of Buldhana District of Maharashtra. It is a pat of the Melghat Tiger Reserve. The sanctuary area include Reserved forest 102.10sqkm, Protected forest 22.62 Sq. km.and remaining land is private cultivation and Abadi lands from ex-forest villages of Ambabarwa, Chunkhadi and Rohinkhidkiof Sangrampur Taluka of Buldhan District.

Management
The Sanctuary is under the Chief Conservator of forest and Field Director, Melghat Tiger Reserve with headquarters at Amravati.

Tourist places
The sanctuary is 65 km from the Shegaon. The tourist zone of the sanctuary is 21.26 Sq. km comprising eight forest compartments. The other tourist attraction are Mangri Mahadev Mandir, Jalkakund, Pipladohkhora, and Chimankhora.

References

Wildlife sanctuaries in Maharashtra
Tourist attractions in Maharashtra